Subtilopeptidase A may refer to:

 Subtilisin, EC 3.4.21.62
 Oryzin, EC 3.4.21.63
 Proteinase K, EC 3.4.21.64
 Thermomycolin, EC 3.4.21.65
 Thermitase, EC 3.4.21.66
 Endopeptidase So, EC 3.4.21.67